Alegrijes y Rebujos (English title: Don Darvelio's Secret) is a Mexican children's telenovela produced by Rosy Ocampo for Televisa. It aired on Canal de las Estrellas from August 4, 2003 to February 20, 2004.

Miguel de León, Jacqueline Bracamontes, Luis Roberto Guzmán and the leading actor Héctor Ortega starred as protagonists, María Chacón and Miguel Martínez starred as child protagonists known as the "Alegrijes", while Rosa María Bianchi starred as adult antagonist, Allisson Lozz, Diego Boneta and Jesús Zavala starred as child antagonists known as the "Rebujos", Arath de la Torre, Roxana Castellanos, Ruben Cerda, Salvador Sánchez, Luz Elena González, Eugenia Cauduro (later replaced by Cecilia Gabriela) and Sebastián Rulli starred as stellar performances.

Plot
Alegrijes y Rebujos follows the story of the ghost of an eccentric millionaire, Don Darvelio, who is said to haunt the mansion. With a jealous stepmother, an inattentive father and a mean brother, Sofia has many problems.

Nonetheless, she wants to find out if there really are ghosts in the mansion, inhabited now by a strange former servant named Chon. Sofia secretly enters the mansion to recover a picture of her mother, who died when she was a baby.

There, she meets Alfonso, Chon's grandnephew. To their amazement, the children discover Don Darvelio is not dead, and he is the one who has been "haunting" the mansion for the last few years.

The old man finds the happiness he had been yearning for in Sofia and Alfonso and he names them "Alegrijes" (or Happies) who enjoy life, never lose hope, share good and bad times, and keep the wonderful gift of amazement.

Sofia, Alfonso and Don Darvelio have incredible adventures that they share with other neighborhood children: Allison, Ricardo, Ernestina, Pablo and even Esteban, Sofia's disagreeable brother.

Don Darvelio decides to transform his mansion into a place where all the children and their families can live together. However, he becomes seriously ill with the arrival of Helga, his wicked ex-wife, who wants to take over the mansion and destroy the dreams and love the old man has created.

In order to overcome Helga and her mean allies, the "Rebujos" (or Grumpies), the children must employ their best values: friendship, truthfulness, fair competition, love, and happiness.

Cast

Main 
Eugenia Cauduro as Mercedes Goyeneche de Dominguez 
Miguel de León as Antonio Domínguez
Cecilia Gabriela as Mercedes Goyenehe de Dominguez 
Luis Roberto Guzmán as Bruno Reyes
Jacqueline Bracamontes as Angélica Rivas Márquez de Domínguez
Rosa María Bianchi as Helga Aguayo Vargas "La Rebruja"
Hector Ortega as Don Darvelio Granados Linares
Salvador Sánchez as Asunción "Chon" Yunque
Olivia Bucio as Teresa "Tere" Aguayo Rosas de Garza
Luz Elena González as Irina Calleja
Sebastián Rulli as Rogelio Díaz Mercado
Raquel Pankowsky as Consuelo "Chelito" Márquez Vda. de Rivas
Roxana Castellanos as Elvira Gómez de Sánchez
Rubén Cerda as Rodolfo Maldonado "Fito"
Adriana Laffan as Flor Cárdenas de Maldonado
María Chacón as Sofia Domínguez "Chofis"
Miguel Martínez as Alfonso Pascual "Alcachofa"
Jesús Zavala as Esteban Domínguez Goyeneche
Diego Boneta as Ricardo Sánchez Gómez
Nora Cano as Nayelli Sánchez Gómez
Michelle Álvarez as Ernestina Garza Aguayo "Tina"
Tony Cobián as Pablo Maldonado Cárdenas "El Chuletón"
Allisson Lozz as Allison Garza Aguayo
Arath de la Torre as Matías Sánchez

Recurring 
Raúl Sebastián as Don Darvelio's ghost
Alfonso Iturralde as Santiago Garza
Alejandro Contreras as Alejandro
Margarito as Reficus
Andrés Salas as Luis Domínguez
Rogelio Báez as El Chompi
Salvador Garcini as Lorenzo
Paco Ibáñez as Captain Sangre
Aida Pierce as Madam Meshú
Archie Lafranco as Guarura
Odín Dupeyrón as Lupillo
Hector Parra as Enrique
Hector Cruz as Polo Velarde
Jose Antonio Ferral as Police
Alejandro Villeli as Elf magic
César Castro as Lawyer
Juan Romanca as Doctor
Radamés de Jesús as Veterinario
Martha Sabrina as Margarita
Carlos Speitzer as Child dimension of darkness
Génesis Bages as Child of darkness

Guest star 
Danna Paola as Amy Granados

Awards

Discography 
Disco Alegrije (2003)
Disco Rebujo (2003)
Navidad Alegrije (2003)
Navidad Rebujo (2003)
Alegrijes y Rebujos en Concierto (2004)

References

External links

 at esmas.com 

2003 telenovelas
Mexican telenovelas
2003 Mexican television series debuts
2004 Mexican television series endings
Spanish-language telenovelas
Television shows set in Mexico City
Televisa telenovelas
Children's telenovelas
Television series about children